Marcus James Titus (born May 20, 1986) is a deaf American swimmer who has made it as far as eighth place in the 2012 Olympic Trials. Titus won a state championship at Flowing Wells High School and is a 12-time-All-American at Arizona, he was a major figure in the US’s 2008 NCAA championship team, and he was previously a coach for the 2013 Deaflympic team. He is also known for being a spokesperson for deaf and hard-hearing athletes in the swimming world.

Titus is the deaf world record holder in the 50-meter freestyle, 100-meter freestyle, 50-meter breaststroke and 100-meter breaststroke, all of which he set records for at the World Deaf Championships. Titus's career highlights include finishing third in the 100-meter breaststroke at the 2009 ConocoPhillips National Championships, placing fourth in the same event the following year in 2010 and, lastly, placing third again the year after that in the 2011 ConocoPhillips National Championships.

In his later career, Titus tried out for the 2012 Olympic Trials, coached the 2013 Deaflympic team, and is planning on returning to compete in the 2016 Rio Olympic Trials.

Early years
Marcus Titus was born on May 20, 1986 in Tucson, Arizona. Titus was born deaf. However, his parents, Mark and Mieko Titus, didn't discover this until the age of three. Titus can hear a close-up conversation at about fifty percent capacity when wearing a device in his right ear. His interpreter, Hans Ferguson, helps him communicate better at meets by using hand signals to inform him when to take his mark and begin the race. Titus attended a Deaf Institute until fourth grade, in which he then went to public school. It was here he found his love for swimming and has continued this dream of competitive swimming. He began swimming at the age of twelve for his high school team, Flowing Wells. There Titus earned four varsity letters in swimming and was named High School All-American as a senior. He participated in the 4x100 medley relay team, helping to lead his team to first place at the National Championships.
Titus earned four varsity letters in swimming at Flowing Wells High School in Tucson, Arizona. He participated in the 4x100 medley relay team, helping to lead his team to first place at the National Championships in which his split time was 1:04.14. At a Speedo Champion Series, Titus took first place in the 100 breaststroke with a time of 1:05.14. Titus was named High School All-American as a senior.

Titus attend the University of Arizona and got his degree in deaf studies/special education. His college swim coach nicknamed him Marcus Aurelius because his name sounded very Roman. Titus also gained the title of a multiple All-American in breaststroke and in medley relay events, placing second in the 2008 NCAAs.

Swimming career

Marcus Titus's swimming career began when he first decided to join his high school swim team at Flowing Wells. He continued swimming throughout all of high school career and eventually continued on with it throughout college when he attended the University of Arizona.  He is the Arizona State University and University of Arizona 100 yard breaststroke record holder. With the help of his coach, Frank Busch,  Titus made the USA National team three years in a row gaining him recognition. During the Pan American Games, Titus won his medal in the 100-meter breaststroke in Guadalajara, earning his first ever medal it an international competition. This along with all the other big events he has attended and placed well, such as NCAA's, US Open, and the Olympic trials has helped to make him one of the most renowned deaf swimmers in United States.

At Arizona State University in 2006, Titus acquired a personal best time of 54.28 in the 100m breast at the Pac-10 Championships, setting a new school record. He also finished 10th in the 200m breaststroke with a time of 2:00.58 and 6th in the 100m breaststroke in the 2005, and at the Texas Invitational with a time of 54.77. Titus also gained the title of a multiple All-American in breaststroke and in medley relay events, placing second in the 2008 NCAAs.

Titus originally attempted to make the USA Olympic team in the 2008 Olympic trials in Beijing but fell short. Hoping to make it in the 2012 Olympic trials, Titus competed in the Pan American Games, in Guadalajara, Mexico, to help prepare.  He needed to make improvements in his stroke technique to allow for less drag. In the 2012 Olympic trials, Titus posted a time of 1:00:49 in breaststroke, coming in eighth place,  just barely missing making the Olympic team by .79 of a second. From his first attempt at the Olympic trials in 2008, Titus shaved off 1.18 seconds off his time in the 2012 Olympic trials. . After this, Titus took a break from competitive swimming to coach the 2013 USA Deaflympics team.

Titus took a position as a coach for the 2013 USA Deaflympics in Sofia, Bulgaria.  As coach, Titus led his team to two new world records and multiple American records and medals.

Titus now hopes to try again in 2016 Rio Olympic trials.

Coaching

Titus took a year off from swimming to take a position as a swim coach for the USA team at the 2013 Deaflympics. Besides swimming, Titus hopes to begin a career in coaching swimmers. In 2013, there was a lot of controversy on whether or not Titus should be the head coach for the Deaflympics team. Titus was first nominated by Dale Parker, the Director of U.S. Deaf Swimming (USDS), for the job, but was turned down by the USA Deaf Sports Federation because he was still considered an active participant in swimming and therefore could not juggle both jobs. While Parker continued to push for Titus saying that U.S. Deaf Swimming’s best candidate to lead the team is Marcus Titus" and arguing that Titus would only be entering in relays while coaching, making him able to take on the responsibilities. Still, USA Deaf Sports Federation still searched for a head coach with a "single role."

Influence in Swimming World

Other than through his success in swimming, he has also made a positive change for deaf swimmers in races and competitions. He has done this through his efforts in contacting the officials about allowing hand signals during races.  After much work and effort put towards getting hand signals in the rule book, USA swimming finally deems them mandatory. In a sport that is decided by only fractions of a second, this allows deaf swimmers to be able to do their best during competition without as many obstacles.

USA Swimming decided to allow hand signals at the U.S. Olympic trials, thanks to Titus and his fan base, to accommodate deaf swimmers. Titus, upon hearing USA Swimming would not allow hand signals to comply with international rules, talked to US Swimming through an attorney. When this didn't work, Titus set up a Facebook page to get fans to e-mail USA swimming officials. Before, they only used strobe lights, which is good for deaf and hearing-impaired swimmers to know when to start the race, but not any other cue. Titus took this as a form of discrimination against deaf and hearing-impaired swimmers. While other swimming organizations used hand signals to accommodate those who are hearing-impaired, USA Swimming did not. Titus, backed up by U.S. Deaf Swimming and USA Deaf Sports Federation, finally got USA Swimming to reverse this decision in July 2012 .

Without hand signals, deaf swimmers are at a real disadvantage. Deaf swimmers need these to hear the referee’ instructions to step up to the starting blocks, take their marks before starting, or even hear the buzzer to dive. In a sport where every millisecond is important, having to look at other swimmers to know when to go can really ruin a race.

Awards

Titus is a 100 breaststroke recorder holder at his university. He placed third in 100m breast at the 2009 ConocoPhillips National Championship as well as fourth in the same event the following year. The last year he competed he got third in the 100m breast at the 2011 ConocoPhillips National Championship. In the 2011 Deaflympics, Titus broke the world record by beating his own record. He was named Swimmer of the Meet when he won five individual gold medals as well as silver and bronze medal at the International Deaf Swimming Competition. Marcus Titus was also in the Mexico Pan American Games in 2011 and won a silver medal in 4x100 medley relay and a bronze medal in 100m breaststroke.  In 2012, he almost made it into the Olympic Roster by eight tenths of a second in the 100 breast stroke.

The USDS Team took 19 Swimmers to World Deaf Swimming Championships in Coimbra, Portugal.  The team brought back a total of 22 medals (11 Gold, 4 Silver, and 7 Bronze).  The USDS (United States Deaf Swim) Team was named 2011 World Deaf Swimming Champions. Titus gained the title "Swimmer of the Meet" after winning five individual gold medals and one individual bronze at the 2011 World Deaf Championships in Portugal. He also won a silver medal and two bronze medals in the relay events. At this meet alone, Titus set deaf world records in the 50m breaststroke, 50m freestyle, and 100m freestyle.

Titus assisted as a coach in Deaflympics and helped the USA Deaflympic team win eighteen new American records and two new world records in the August 2013 Deaflympic Games in Sofia, Bulgaria. The team, made up of eleven swimmers, triumphed with two gold medals, a silver medal, and three bronze medals. The team also accomplished earning multiple personal best times and three American records with two world records.

References

External links
 

1986 births
Living people
American male freestyle swimmers
American male breaststroke swimmers
Pan American Games bronze medalists for the United States
Pan American Games medalists in swimming
Swimmers at the 2011 Pan American Games
Medalists at the 2011 Pan American Games